Hadley is a village and part of the new town of Telford in the borough of Telford and Wrekin and the ceremonial county of Shropshire, England.

The population of the civil parish mentioned at the 2011 census was 14,166.

It neighbours Wellington, a market town also part of Telford, and that town's two colleges of Telford College of Arts and Technology (TCAT) and New College (NC), all to the west of Hadley. Ketley is immediately to the south of Hadley.

Hadley Learning Community, opened in 2006, is a coeducational all-through school for students from 5 – 16 years of age located in Hadley.

Hadley's parish war memorial, to men of Hadley and district who died serving in the two World Wars, is an imitation of the Cenotaph in London's Whitehall. It stands in Manse Road near the Methodist Church.

Notable people
Diarist Hannah Cullwick lived at a cottage rented in Hadley from 1887 before moving to Shifnal in 1903.
Jerry Dean (footballer) was born in Hadley in 1881. He became a professional player, notably for Notts County.
On 13 September 1919, Harry Patch, who became the last surviving British combat soldier of World War I, married his first wife, Ada Billington, at Hadley parish church. Billington later died in 1976.
Len Murray, Baron Murray of Epping Forest, trade union leader, was born in Hadley in 1922.
Ernie Clements, British racing cyclist, was also born in Hadley in 1922.
The ashes of Dalian Atkinson, footballer, are buried in Hadley cemetery.

See also
Listed buildings in Hadley and Leegomery

References

Telford